Tennille Banking Company Building is a historic structure in Tennille, Georgia. It was added to the National Register of Historic Places on July 28, 1994. It is located at 102-104 North Main Street. The Tennille Banking Company opened in 1900. The building was designed by Charles E. Choate (August 31, 1865 – 1929) who lived for ten years in Tennille.

See also
Wrightsville and Tennille Railroad Company Building
National Register of Historic Places listings in Washington County, Georgia

References

Buildings and structures in Washington County, Georgia
Bank buildings on the National Register of Historic Places in Georgia (U.S. state)
Commercial buildings completed in 1900
National Register of Historic Places in Washington County, Georgia